Campus Corner is a college-oriented commercial district in Norman, Oklahoma located directly north of the University of Oklahoma campus.  The area is bounded by White Street, University Boulevard, Boyd Street, and Asp Avenue.  The district is home to four blocks of unique retail shopping and mixed-use development, including restaurants, bars, clothing stores, OU memorabilia, personal care, and other businesses and professional organizations.  Established in 1917, the area around Boyd Street and Asp Avenue has long been a focal for OU pep rallies and other displays of school spirit.

History

Campus Corner was developed during the early 1900s to serve the needs of the faculty and students working at and living nearby the University of Oklahoma.  Nearly all student housing was located in the Campus Corner area and at the time students were not permitted to drive.  This caused the area to grow rapidly, becoming a thriving business district by 1920.  Restaurants, clothing stores, laundry facilities, pharmacies, and beauty salons soon opened for business.  One of the early developers in Campus Corner was the Whistler Family, responsible for additions to the area such as the 575 University building which ultimately housed a bookstore, supply shop, restaurant, and a dance floor.  In 1929 a tragic fire destroyed most of the then-existing Campus Corner; however, within a few years the area was rebuilt and the fire ultimately led to further expansion.

Throughout the 1930s the area continued to grow with the addition of new restaurants, cleaners, and a department store.  In 1947 the Boomer Theater was constructed at 765 Asp Avenue.  Originally a movie theater, in its later years the Boomer Theater became a concert venue before finally being remodeled for use as a department store/office space during the 1980s.

During the 1950s enrollment at the university was swelling and as a result Campus Corner was booming.  Because of the close proximity between merchants and students, a unique relationship was formed. Many activities were held in Campus Corner. Some of those included RUF/NEKS (a university pep squad) ceremonies, the public shaving of beards to signal the end of Engineers Week, tobacco spitting contests, and numerous bonfires celebrating football games.

By the early 1960s enrollment was growing greater than the university's ability to house its students and as a result the decision was made to build new housing on the south end of campus.  With the new residence towers completed in the mid-1960s, the popularity of Campus Corner waned.  More students were living further from campus as dorms and Greek houses changed locations and more students began to drive.  In the 1970s retailers began to build malls and strip centers further west of campus with better access to Norman's primary highway, Interstate 35.

What must never be forgotten is that Campus Corner was a beacon of diversity and a cauldron of creativity in the 80's and 90's.  Kids and young adults of all walks of life congregated in the area to gather at the myriad stores, restaurants, and bars, all of which were independently owned and privately run.  The majority of these are gone now, being forced out by corporate interests.  Due to the diversity of cultures, and the changes in the political, social, and even musical landscape of the times, Campus Corner became a bastion of alternative lifestyles and American subcultures.  Where acceptance for being different was rare in Oklahoma, it seemed that anyone was welcome on Campus Corner.  Punks, Goths, Gays, Emos, Nerds, Geeks, and Club Kids all found a home there when no one else cared.  This in turn gave birth to the Norman music scene of the time.  Chainsaw Kittens, Flaming Lips, The Buttmen, Ancient Chinese Penis, Gash Wagon, Hinder, The Nixons, The Deathro Bodeans, Defenestration, Blemish, The Starlight Mints, The Mimsies, Doebelly, and Klipspringer are all bands from the era with ties to Norman, and Campus Corner specifically.  Local kids and aspiring musicians would grab a slice at Bob's Hole in the Wall, so named for the hole in the wall of the pizza shop that led into Shock Therapy, a local pool hall.  People regularly frequented Shadowplay, the areas strongest independent record store where many musicians worked.  The Deli, which is one of the only businesses to survive the corporate takeover of Campus Corner has been showcasing local and live talent for decades.  The Quarterhouse, a combination bar/grill/pool hall/arcade, was a hub of activity in the 90's after Bob's and Shock Therapy closed down.  Also amongst the businesses that fostered this generation was Tina's Guitars, Cafe Expresso, Vito's Pizza, Town Tavern, The Sunshine Store, New York Pizza, Othello's, The Lovelight, Toto's,  and Liberty D's.  Very few of which remain today.  With nowhere to go, and no place to play, the vivid scene on Campus Corner gave way to mainstream businesses and clientele.  Local resident, W.B. Humphrey was quoted as saying, "That was when the heart and soul of Campus Corner was sold to the devil for a few McRestaurants and iPubs in the name of "civic improvements".

As a result of civic improvements and private funding, the area began to re-emerge as a shopping and social destination in the early-2000s.  In recent years the city has improved the infrastructure in the area including new utility lines, lights, security systems, landscaping, parking meters with one-hour limits, curbs, sidewalks, and traffic controls.  Campus Corner property owners have also consolidated their properties and organized with one another to deal with long-standing challenges in the area.  Owners and tenants have renovated the century-old buildings, having demolished interior walls, re-wired, and re-plumbed much of the area to meet modern city codes.  In 2003, head OU football coach Bob Stoops became part owner of a new sports bar in Campus Corner that started a wave of new restaurant openings.  Since that time many new businesses have been established in the area, its growth continuing into the 2010s.

Harold's

In 1935 high school student Harold Powell began working for McCall's department store in Campus Corner; several years later, in 1948, McCall's left the area and Powell opened his own store at the same location.  Called Harold's, the department store initially focused on traditional clothing for the many college students in the area.  In the 1970s Harold's expanded with new locations in Oklahoma City, Tulsa, and Memphis, Tennessee.  Throughout the 1970s and 1980s Harold's went on to become a successful regional chain of traditional, high-end men's and women's clothing stores with its headquarters in Dallas.  The Campus Corner location remained open until 2008 when the chain filed for bankruptcy, liquidating all of its assets and closing all store locations.

Campus Corner today

Today, Campus Corner is home to many businesses including bars, restaurants, banks, computer/technology retail, coffee shops, a newspaper, hair salons, gift shops, accessories boutiques, churches, professional organizations, a bridal shop, and several professional offices.

References

External links 

Campus Corner
City of Norman 

University of Oklahoma
Geography of Cleveland County, Oklahoma
Entertainment districts in the United States
Buildings and structures in Norman, Oklahoma